Alles außer Mord (Everything but Murder) was a German crime television series which aired on the TV station ProSieben between 1993 and 1995. 14 episodes were produced. The series features various criminal cases led by private investigator Uli Fichte (Dieter Landuris), who tells his clients that he will take any case, except murder. The series was created by Michael Baier.

The unstable PI Fichte lives in an old industrial building in the port of Hamburg and drives an old Mercedes-Benz. His social entourage is made up of psychologist Dr. Frieder Tamm, his wife Melanie, his two sons, and the journalist Horst Weinstein. In spite of his personal motto, Fichte always ends up dealing with murder cases, even though at the beginning of each episode, these cases appear innocent and straightforward.

The series received low ratings during its original run despite positive reviews, and ProSieben produced few episodes. Between 1993 and 1995, three seasons with a combined total of 14 episodes were  made. The series was cancelled in 1996.

A boxset with all 14 episodes on 7 DVDs was published in 2008.

See also
 List of German television series

References

External links
 

German crime television series
1993 German television series debuts
1995 German television series endings
Television shows set in Hamburg
ProSieben original programming
German-language television shows